Miss Teen USA is an American beauty pageant that has been held annually since 1983, either under the direct management of the Miss Universe Organization or, beginning with the 2021 competition, as a licensed pageant. It was already an established national pageant before Miss Universe, Inc. began its own version of it in 1983.

The first Miss Teen USA competition first took place as a mail-in photo contest conducted by Teen magazine in 1959.  It later took place as a live stage event.

Titleholders

1959 
 1959: Peggy Collins, 17, of Lake Charles, Louisiana.

1962 to 1968 

Miss Teen USA titleholders from 1962 to 1968 include:
 1962: Linda Henning, 15, of Sioux Falls, South Dakota.
 1963: Judy Adams, 16, of Ohio.
 1964: Nancy Spry of Van Nuys, California.
 1965: Susan Henning, 18, of Palos Verdes, California.
 1966: Cindy Lewis.
 1968: Pamela Martin, 18, of Birmingham, Michigan.

1980 to 1982 
Miss Teen USA titleholders from 1980 to 1982 include:
 1980: Susan McDannold, 19, of St. Albans, West Virginia.
 1981: Tammy Jo Hopkins, 17, of Omaha, Nebraska (partial reign, relinquished title to Susan McDannold).
 1981: Susan McDannold, 19, of St. Albans, West Virginia (1980 titleholder also).
 1982: Hugrun Ragnarsson, 18, of Long Island, New York.

1983 to present 

This is a list of delegates who have won the Miss Teen USA beauty pageant during the era when it was run by or associated with the Miss Universe Organization, including to the present day.

Winners gallery

By number of wins

References

External links

Miss Teen USA titleholders
Miss Teen USA titleholders
Miss Teen USA titleholders